Barrancas National Cemetery is a United States National Cemetery located at Naval Air Station Pensacola, in the city of Pensacola, Florida. It encompasses , and as of 2021 had over 50,000 interments.

History 
The area has been used as a burial ground since the construction of Fort Barrancas. In 1838 it was established as a United States Navy cemetery. During the Civil War, Pensacola was hotly contested, as it was considered to be the best port for access to the Gulf of Mexico. Numerous soldiers on both sides were interred in the cemetery after falling in combat, or dying in nearby hospitals. After the war, in 1868, Barrancas was officially made a National Cemetery and many other nearby makeshift burial grounds were disinterred and relocated to Barrancas. In each year, 1944, 1950, 1986, and 1990, more area was transferred from NAS Pensacola to expand the facilities for the cemetery.

Notable monuments 
Barrancas National Cemetery has a monument honoring those soldiers who died from yellow fever. It was erected in 1884 by the Marine Guard of the Pensacola Navy Yard.

Notable interments 
 Medal of Honor recipients
 Colonel George E. "Bud" Day, USAF, former POW and recipient for action in the Vietnam War
 Commander Clyde Everett Lassen, USN, recipient for action in the Vietnam War
 Major Stephen W. Pless, USMC, recipient for action in the Vietnam War
 Staff Sergeant Clifford Chester Sims, USA, recipient for action in the Vietnam War
 Others
 Vice admiral Dick H. Guinn, USN, World War II veteran and Navy Cross recipient. Former Chief of Naval Personnel
 Lieutenant General Robert P. Keller, USMC, Marine Aviator during World War II, Korea and Vietnam
 General Joe W. Kelly, USAF, former commander of Military Air Transport Service from 1960 to 1964
 Major General William L. McKittrick, USMC, Marine Aviator during World War II
 Colonel Arthur D. Simons, USA, Special Forces commander and leader of the Sơn Tây raid
 Benny Spellman (1931–2011), US Army Korean War veteran and R&B singer
 Admiral Maurice F. Weisner, USN, former commander of US Pacific Command from 1976 to 1979
 Daniel Phineas Woodbury (1812–1864), Civil War Union Major General
 Ga-Ah, one of the many wives of the Apache Indian Geronimo, who died of Bright's disease while being held captive

The cemetery also holds 17 casualties of the Second Seminole War and 10 British aviators (6 Royal Navy, 4 Royal Air Force) killed during training at the Naval Air Station during World War II.

See also 
 United States Department of Veterans Affairs

References

External links 
 National Cemetery Administration
 Barrancas National Cemetery
 Barrancas National Cemetery, records of burials
 Photos of Barrancas National Cemetery
 
 
 
 

Cemeteries on the National Register of Historic Places in Florida
Buildings and structures in Pensacola, Florida
National Register of Historic Places in Escambia County, Florida
United States national cemeteries
Protected areas of Escambia County, Florida
Historic American Buildings Survey in Florida
Historic American Landscapes Survey in Florida
Tourist attractions in Pensacola, Florida